Star High School or Star School is a 1A public high school located in Star, Texas, United States. It is part of the Star Independent School District located in east central Mills County. The school has all grades (K-12) in one building with students attending from portions of Hamilton and Lampasas counties along with Star. In 2011, the school was rated "academically acceptable" by the Texas Education Agency. Star School is scheduled to be consolidated with a neighboring district after the 2013–14 school year.

Athletics
Basketball
6-man American football

See also

List of high schools in Texas
List of Six-man football stadiums in Texas

References

External links
Star ISD

Schools in Mills County, Texas
Public high schools in Texas
Public middle schools in Texas
Public elementary schools in Texas